Camel are an English progressive rock band from Guildford, Surrey. Formed in October 1971, the group originally featured guitarist, flautist and vocalist Andrew Latimer, bassist and vocalist Doug Ferguson, keyboardist and vocalist Peter Bardens, and drummer Andy Ward. The band's current lineup includes Latimer, bassist, keyboardist and vocalist Colin Bass (from 1979 to 1981, and since 1984), drummer Denis Clement (since 2000), and keyboardist and saxophonist Peter Jones (since 2016).

History

1971–1984
Camel were formed in October 1971 by Andrew Latimer, Doug Ferguson, Peter Bardens and Andy Ward. During the tour in promotion of the band's fourth studio album Moonmadness, the group's lineup became a quintet with the addition of former King Crimson saxophonist and flautist Mel Collins. In early 1977, Ferguson was replaced by former Caravan bassist Richard Sinclair. Bardens followed the next July, with his place taken by two former bandmates of Sinclair in Caravan – Jan Schelhaas and Dave Sinclair, Richard's cousin. Both Sinclairs left after the Breathless tour.

In early 1979, Camel returned with bassist Colin Bass and former Happy the Man keyboardist/flautist Kit Watkins in place of the Sinclair cousins. Mel Collins also stepped back from the band as a full-time member, although continued to collaborate with them on occasion. Neither of the band's keyboardists contributed to 1981's Nude, which featured Duncan Mackay, although they returned for the subsequent tour. After the tour ended in mid-1981, Ward attempted to commit suicide after increasing drug and alcohol abuse, which led to the group all but disbanding that summer.

As the only remaining member of Camel by early 1982, Andrew Latimer recorded The Single Factor with Alan Parsons Project members Chris Rainbow (keyboards, vocals) and David Paton (bass, vocals), while drums were covered by various guest contributors. Kit Watkins rejoined the trio for the subsequent touring cycle, which also featured second guitarist Andy Dalby and drummer Stuart Tosh. In January 1983, Ward – still a contracted member of the band – officially left Camel. He was replaced by Paul Burgess, while Watkins was replaced by Kayak's Ton Scherpenzeel.

1984–1999
After the release of Stationary Traveller, Colin Bass returned to Camel and Richie Close joined on keyboards for the resulting tour, which spawned the live release Pressure Points: Live in Concert. Following the conclusion of the touring cycle, Camel remained dormant for much of the rest of the decade – Latimer and his former bandmates were involved in legal disputes with their former management company, in 1985 the group parted ways with Decca Records, and in 1988 the group's frontman decided to move to the United States, start his own label and build his own studio.

In September 1991, Camel released their first studio album in seven years, Dust and Dreams, which featured a lineup of Andrew Latimer, Colin Bass, Ton Scherpenzeel and Paul Burgess, in addition to several guests. The band started touring again the following year, with Scherpenzeel replaced by Mickey Simmonds. On 5 March 1993, Latimer's father Stan died, leading the band to take another hiatus and delay the release of the live album Never Let Go. As of spring 1994, Latimer had begun writing a new album, and the group's lineup still included Bass, Simmonds and Burgess.

Recording for the album, Harbour of Tears, commenced in March 1995 with Latimer, Bass and Simmonds joined by session contributor John Xepoleas. After the album's release in January, the group were due to embark on another tour, however shortly before its commencement Simmonds announced that he was leaving the band to spend more time with his family, forcing the remaining members to postpone the tour. Simmonds and Burgess were eventually replaced by Fish members Foss Patterson and Dave Stewart, respectively, and the tour took place during 1997.

Since 1999
Andrew Latimer, Colin Bass and Dave Stewart released Rajaz in 1999, which featured keyboards performed remotely and sent to the band by Ton Scherpenzeel. For the tour in promotion of the release the following year, Guy LeBlanc took over the vacant keyboardist position in March 2000. However, just two weeks after his arrival, Stewart announced that he would be leaving the group; his position was briefly taken by former Jethro Tull drummer Clive Bunker, before LeBlanc brought in former bandmate Denis Clement just ten days before the start of the tour in August.

In 2003, the band embarked on a 'farewell' tour. Due to a family emergency, LeBlanc was unavailable for the tour's duration; he was replaced by Tom Brislin for the North American leg in June, and later by Scherpenzeel for the European leg in October. Ten years later, after Latimer recovered from several years of illness, Camel returned on the Retirement Sucks Tour with special guest keyboardist Jan Schelhaas. In October, Schelhaas was replaced by Renaissance keyboardist Jason Hart, as the group planned to continue touring in 2014 which would present scheduling conflicts.

LeBlanc was forced to sit out Camel tours starting in February 2014 due to ill health, with Scherpenzeel returning again in his place. LeBlanc eventually died of kidney cancer on 27 April 2015. In February 2016, Peter Jones took over on keyboards.

Members

Current

Former

Touring

Timeline

Lineups

References

External links
Camel Productions official website

Camel